Hydro-lyases (EC 4.2.1) are a type of enzyme.  As lyases, hydro-lyases cleave various chemical bonds by means other than hydrolysis and oxidation.  Examples of specific hydro-lyases include carbonic anhydrase (EC 4.2.1.1) and fumarase (EC 4.2.1.2).

References

Lyases